Wethersfield is a village and civil parish on the B1053 road in the Braintree district of Essex, England. It is near the River Pant. Wethersfield has a school, a social club, a fire station and one places of worship. Nearby settlements include the town of Braintree and the village of Finchingfield. The village probably gets its name from a Viking invader named Wuthha or Wotha, who controlled that particular "field" or clearing. Reverend Patrick Brontë, father of the Brontë sisters, was a young curate here in 1807, as was the Rev. John West, missionary to Canada, who married Harriet Atkinson here in 1807.

MDP Wethersfield is the headquarters and training centre for the Ministry of Defence Police, located at the former RAF Station Wethersfield, used by the RAF, United States Army Air Force (USAAF) and the United States Air Force (USAF).  This village is also one of The Hundred Parishes.

The civil parish includes the hamlets of Beazley End, Blackmore End, and Brickkiln Green.

Wethersfield, Essex is the namesake of Wethersfield, Connecticut.

References 

Villages in Essex
Civil parishes in Essex
Braintree District